Gumbasia is a 3-minute short film released on September 2, 1953, the first clay animation produced by Art Clokey. He used the same technique to create the classic characters Gumby and Davey and Goliath.

Production
Clokey created Gumbasia while a student at the University of Southern California under the direction of Slavko Vorkapić. In his father's garage, he worked the clay on a ping-pong table. The film is a surreal short of pulsating shapes and lumps of clay set to jazz music in a homage of Walt Disney's Fantasia.

Gumbasia was created in a style Vorkapić taught, called Kinesthetic Film Principles and described as "massaging of the eye cells". Based on camera movements and stop-motion editing, this provides much of the look and feel of Gumby films.

When Clokey showed Gumbasia to film producer Sam Engel in 1955, Engel funded a 15-minute short film that became the first Gumby episode, "Gumby Goes to the Moon". Based on that episode, a TV series titled Fun in Gumbasia was scheduled for release in mid-2017.

References

External links
 
 
 Article at Gumbyworld.com
 Premavision/Clokey Productions
 ArtClokey: the First 50 Years

1955 films
Clay animation films
Articles containing video clips
1955 animated films
Abstract animation
Animated films without speech
American animated short films
1955 short films
1950s stop-motion animated films
1950s American films
1950s American animated films